Roberto Martínez (born 22 October 1966) is a Honduran boxer. He competed in the men's middleweight event at the 1988 Summer Olympics.

References

1966 births
Living people
Honduran male boxers
Olympic boxers of Honduras
Boxers at the 1988 Summer Olympics
Place of birth missing (living people)
Middleweight boxers